The Grace A. Dow Memorial Library is the public library of the City of Midland and serves residents of Midland and of the contracting Midland County townships: Edenville, Greendale, Homer, Hope, Ingersoll, Jerome, Larkin, Lee, Lincoln, Midland, Mills, and Mt. Haley.

History
In 1899, Midland Library Association was formed as a subscription library with 25 charter members paying $1 a year that entitled them to check out 1 book a week for the year. Mary Dow, sister to Herbert H. Dow, was the first librarian. In 1900, The Library Association opened their subscription library in a room at the Unitarian Church with a collection of 100 books. In May, 1900, a Free Reading Room was established with the support of local manufacturers and businesses.  In 1915, the Library Association transferred control of the Midland Library and Free Reading Room to the Midland Board of Education.  In 1919, the Carnegie Library opened next to the Community Center on Townsend Street.

The Library Board was dissolved in 1951 and the City of Midland established a Library Advisory Board.  All Library employees became employees of the City of Midland.

A new library was opened on Monday, January 24, 1955 at the corner of West St. Andrews Street and Eastman Avenue.  It was named the "Grace A. Dow Memorial Library" after architect Alden B. Dow's mother.  Grace A. Dow, wife of Herbert Henry Dow (founder of the Dow Chemical Company), was instrumental in the construction of the new library.  After her death in 1953, before construction began, the library was named in her memory.  The new Grace A. Dow Memorial Library celebrated 50 years in this building in 2005.

On October 21, 2012, library director Melissa Barnard announced a $3 million grant from the Herbert H. and Grace A. Dow Foundation to pay for infrastructure improvements and interior remodeling. Including this gift, the foundation has given $9.1 million to the library since 1938.  Renovation work took place from the end of 2013 through the beginning of 2014 and included carpet and furniture replacement, HVAC replacement, wood refinishing on the Mezzanine, and the change to RFID tagging in library materials.
Due to storms which also broke two dams in Midland County, the library’s children area flooded. The response to this was made harder by the ongoing Covid-19 Pandemic
  The renovations changed the interior of the library to better align with Alden B. Dow's vision for the building.

Services
The library provides access to information to members of the community through print and non-print resources. Knowledgeable staff help connect users to these resources to meet their needs. The library provides access to the internet free of charge to all visitors (time limits are in place), through dedicated computers, rental laptops, a building-wide wireless network, and netbooks for youth. Cardholders can visit the library's website to access a wide selection of specialized databases, downloadable e-audio books, eBooks, and more. Library card holders can access their accounts, place holds, renew items, search databases, and download audio books and eBooks from home or business computers.

Educational & enrichment programming for adults includes computer classes, speakers on many topics, a library-sponsored book discussion group, Battle of the Books for adults, community reads, and a Summer Reading Program.  In addition, volunteers are available weekday afternoons to help with in-depth genealogy research.

Programming for children includes storytimes, the Beyond Books literacy center, the Discovery Depot play area, a Summer Reading Program, Battle of the Books for fourth and fifth graders, and other book discussions and activities.

For teens, the library offers the "Teen Spot" teen room, book-related programs, a volunteer program, and a Summer Reading Program.

The library building has meeting rooms, a community room, and auditorium available for rent, a quiet reading room and individual study areas, gathering spaces for small groups, and a gallery that can be rented for exhibitions. The former Cup and Chaucer coffee shop, a partnership with the Arnold Center, closed in 2016.

Collections
Library collections include print and downloadable books for all ages; CD, mp3, and downloadable audiobooks for all ages; theatrical movies, foreign films, documentaries, and educational DVDs. Special collections include graphic novels for children, teens, and adults; large print books; and a genealogy and local history collection.

About the library

The Friends of the Grace A. Dow Memorial Library group raises money for the library through book sales.  The group's fundraising efforts support not only such programming as Battle of the Books and the Summer Reading Program, but also physical updates to the building such as the recent renovation of the Library Auditorium.  Some members of the Friends of the Library were commended in 2013 for having volunteered with the group since its inception 40 years before.

The building is also home to the studios and offices of Midland Community Television, the Public, educational, and government access (PEG) cable TV channel for Midland, which cablecasts three stations on the local Charter cable system.

The library features a large children's section and a Teen Spot, a place specially for 6th through 12th graders, and includes many young adult books, computers, comfortable seating and an island table.

The library also rents laptops out for use within the building and has free Wi-Fi.

Honors and awards
The library received the Michigan State Librarian's Excellence Award for exemplary public service in 2005. The honor, which includes a $5,000 grant and a trophy, is given to one library in the state each year.

Patrons from the library were able to win a nationwide contest in early 2011: "I Love My Library". Their entries included an explanation as to why their library deserved to win the award.

References

External links 
Grace A. Dow Memorial Library
History of the Grace A. Dow Memorial Library

Library buildings completed in 1953
Dow Chemical Company
Public libraries in Michigan
Midland, Michigan
Buildings and structures in Midland County, Michigan
Education in Midland County, Michigan
Alden B. Dow buildings